"Dessert" is a song by American singer and producer Dawin. It was released on March 17, 2015.

Another version of the song features American rapper Silentó.

Music video
The song's accompanying music video premiered on October 19, 2015, on Dawin's YouTube account on Vevo and features Silentó. YouTube personality Rosanna Pansino also appears in the video. Since its release, the music video has received over 220 million views on YouTube as of April 2022. The lyric video, also released on Vevo, has surpassed 145 million views on YouTube.

Live performances
Dawin performed the song live on the Filipino noontime variety show Eat Bulaga! in March 2016.

Charts

Year-end charts

Certifications

References

External links

2015 songs
2015 singles
Republic Records singles
Casablanca Records singles